Daniel O'Reilly (born 17 June 1984 in Kingston upon Thames, London, England), otherwise known as Dapper Laughs, is a British social media content creator and comedian from Addlestone, Surrey.

Career and controversies
In 2014, O'Reilly released the single "Proper Moist" as Dapper Laughs. The song entered the UK Singles Chart at number 15. Starting in 2014, Laughs began his Moist Tour of the UK; his supporting act on the tour was fellow Viner Joe Charman. In July, he released "Take It To The Base". The music video was released on YouTube, but has since been made private.

Derogatory lyrics about homeless people
In November 2014, Laughs criticised the website UsVsTh3m on Twitter for what he viewed as an unfavourable review of his new album Proper Naughty Christmas. O'Reilly suggested that the review could hinder his goal of raising money for homelessness charity Shelter. As a result of UsVsTh3m highlighting the lyrics of one of the album tracks as offensive to the homeless, the charity posted on their official Twitter feed that they would be refusing donations from O'Reilly. O'Reilly later made an apology in a statement.

Sexism and comments about rape
In September 2014, his TV show, entitled Dapper Laughs: On the Pull, began on ITV2, where he parodied a dating expert

O'Reilly was heavily criticised in November 2014 when, soon after accusations that his show was degrading to women, he joked that a female audience member was "gagging for a rape" at one of his live shows. An online petition eventually gained 68,210 signatures with the hashtag #CancelDapper asked ITV to end the series. On 10 November, ITV announced they were not renewing the series for a second season as a result. A forthcoming Dapper Laughs tour was also cancelled.

Retirement and return of Dapper Laughs character
On 11 November 2014, O'Reilly announced on Newsnight that his Dapper Laughs character had been indefinitely retired. When interviewed on the BBC programme, he claimed he did not realise the problems he had caused. O'Reilly also claimed that the media played a major role in the anger directed at him. In December that year, O'Reilly resurrected the character. On 25 December 2014, a YouTube and Facebook video was posted stating that O'Reilly's character Dapper Laughs would be making a return with the promise of toned down content. On 15 January 2015, he announced his "The Res'Erection" stand-up show. On 8 March 2015 a pilot for a web-exclusive sitcom based on the character was uploaded to YouTube.

Glasgow gig cancellation
In March 2015 it was announced that Dapper Laughs was booked to appear on 2 April 2015 at Campus Glasgow, which describes itself as "Glasgow’s first frat house" (which are not generally a feature of British universities). The event was described as a "live PA, meet & greet and photo opportunity". After an online petition gathered more than 1,000 signatures in 24 hours the venue cancelled the booking, citing "too much negativity towards the act".

Plagiarism
In June 2015 The Guardian reported that his website DappsDaily.com had plagiarised material from other websites.

Big Brother appearance and criticism 
In January 2018, O'Reilly entered the Celebrity Big Brother house as a housemate during its twenty-first series. He was the eighth housemate to be evicted.

The Telegraph writer Ed Power wrote an article called 'Should Dapper Laughs Even Be On National Television?' following O'Reilly's entry to the Big Brother house. Power labelled O'Reilly as a 'comedian whose best known accomplishment was torpedoing his career with a rape joke'. Another Telegraph writer, Michael Hogan, wrote an article titled "If Dapper Laughs Wins, It's The Final Nail In The Coffin For Celebrity Big Brother". Hogan remarked that Dapper Laughs is 'not dapper, provides no laughs and isn't really a celebrity.'

Personal life

O'Reilly has two daughters. He proposed to his longtime girlfriend Shelley in January 2018, during his eviction interview on Celebrity Big Brother.

Filmography

Discography

Singles

References

External links

20th-century births
Living people
British Internet celebrities
People from Clapham
Year of birth missing (living people)